Nceba Ephraim Hinana (born 13 April 1966) is a South African politician of the Democratic Alliance who served as a Member of the National Assembly of South Africa from May 2019 until his resignation in March 2023. He was a Member of the Western Cape Provincial Parliament from May 2014 to May 2019.

Political career
Hinana served as a DA councillor in the City of Cape Town before his election to the Western Cape Provincial Parliament in May 2014. He was then appointed chairperson of the transport and public works committee.

Prior to the 2019 general election, he was given the 16th position on the DA's national list. At the election on 8 May 2019, he won a seat in the National Assembly. Hinana was sworn in as a Member of Parliament on 22 May 2019. In parliament, he served as an alternate member of the  Portfolio Committee on Employment and Labour.

Hinana resigned from the National Assembly on 4 March 2023.

References

External links
Nceba Ephraim Hinana at People's Assembly
Mr Nceba Ephraim Hinana at Parliament of South Africa

Living people
1966 births
Xhosa people
Politicians from Cape Town
Members of the Western Cape Provincial Parliament
Members of the National Assembly of South Africa
Democratic Alliance (South Africa) politicians